The 2017 mayoral election in Allentown, Pennsylvania was held on November 7, 2017, and resulted in the incumbent mayor Ed Pawlowski, a member of the Democratic Party, being re-elected to a fourth term over Republican Party candidate Nat Hyman.

Background
Pawlowski was seeking his fourth term as Mayor, having been first elected in 2005.

Campaign
The Republican nominee was Nat Hyman, a jeweler and real estate developer. Hyman was the first Republican candidate to make an Allentown mayoral election competitive in a decade. Common Sense Independent Party candidate John Richard Ingram, also a real estate developer, and Solomon Tembo, the candidate of the King Solomon Tembo party, were also on the ballot. Ray O'Connell, the president of the Allentown City Council, also ran as a write-in candidate. O'Connell; Siobhan "Sam" Bennett, who had been upset in the 2005 and the 2001 democratic primaries; Lehigh County Commissioner David Jones; Joshua Siegel; Charlie Thiel, a member of the Allentown school board; and Nathan Woodring also sought the Democratic Party nomination. Luiz Garcia also sought the Republican nomination.

No debates were held during the election; instead the candidates engaged in retail politics. Pawlowski worked to increase turnout among Allentown's Hispanic and Syrian populations.

In July 2017 Pawlowski was the subject of a 54-count indictment that alleged that he conspired to provide municipal contracts in return for campaign contributions, dinners and tickets to sports events.

Results

Aftermath
Pawlowski resigned in March 2018 following his conviction on corruption charges. The City Council selected O'Connell to succeed Pawlowski later that month.

See also
 2017 United States elections
 List of mayors of Allentown, Pennsylvania

References

Allentown
Allentown
2017